Shewanella benthica is an obligately piezophilic bacterium from the genus of Shewanella which has been isolated from the sea cucumber Psychropotes longicauda from the Walvis Ridge.

References

Alteromonadales
Bacteria described in 1986